The 27th World Mountain Running Championships were held in Tirana, Albania on September 11, 2011. Around 400 athletes from 5 continents were present.

Results

References

Report
Hussain, Bashir (2011-09-13). USA double, as eleven nations take medals at the 27th World Mountain Running Championships. IAAF/WMRA. Retrieved on 2011-09-24.
Results
Men's, Women's, Junior Men's, Junior Women's
Team results

External links
 WMRA website
 Official competition website

World Mountain Running Championships
World Mountain Running
2011 in Albanian sport
Sports competitions in Albania